J. Krishnaswamy (1932 – 6 November 1981), also known as Krishna "Kittu", was a former footballer who represented India as a forward at the 1956 Summer Olympics, where he scored once. He was also vice-captain of the national team.

Career
Krishnaswamy represented India at the 1956 Melbourne Olympics and reached the semi-finals, before going down 1–4 to Yugoslavia, which is still considered India's greatest ever achievement in football. Under the coaching of Syed Abdul Rahim, he played alongside Neville D'Souza, Samar Banerjee, P. K. Banerjee, and achieved fame worldwide.

Managerial career
After retirement, Krishnaswamy became the head coach of the Indian national team that participated in 1974 Merdeka Tournament. He was also appointed head coach of the Indian women's national team and managed the team at the 1980 AFC Women's Championship, in which they finished as runners-up.

Honours

India
 Colombo Cup: 1955

See also

 History of Indian football
 History of the India national football team
 India national football team at the Olympics
 List of India national football team captains
 List of India national football team managers

References

External links
 

1932 births
1981 deaths
Indian footballers
India international footballers
People from Thanjavur
Footballers from Tamil Nadu
East Bengal Club players
Footballers at the 1956 Summer Olympics
Olympic footballers of India
Association football forwards
India national football team managers
India women's national football team managers
Indian football managers
Indian football coaches
Calcutta Football League players
Footballers at the 1954 Asian Games
Asian Games competitors for India